A cattle prod, also called a stock prod or a hot stick, is a handheld device commonly used to make cattle or other livestock move by striking or poking them.  An electric cattle prod is a stick with electrodes on the end which is used to make cattle move via a relatively high-voltage, low-current electric shock. The electric cattle prod is said to have been invented by Texas cattle baron Robert J. Kleberg, Jr. of the King Ranch around 1930, although versions were sold as early as 1917.

Electric prods 

A hotshot is typically cylindrical, and can carry an open electric current at the "shock end" when activated. The electric current at the shock end runs through two metal electrodes. Anything that touches the electric current receives a high-voltage low-current shock, not strong enough to kill a human or a large animal such as a cow or sheep from short-term exposure, but strong enough to cause significant pain.

The electric cattle prod is designed to inflict a painful shock to cattle, and thus "prod" them along; the pain stimulates movement. Some higher-voltage prods can interfere with radio and CB radio reception when activated.

There are various designs of electric cattle prods. Their shape is often subject to guidelines of what can easily be used and handled. They range in length from six inches (usually of a more encased rectangular prism design like a stun gun), to up to six feet. As the precursor of stun guns, cattle prods also have a wide range of voltage with enough current to operate in the same manner as a stun gun does against humans. Whether it is called a cattle prod or a stun gun, both units are shaped for easy carry and function in the same manner against animals or humans. Most are simple designs powered by 9-volt or a combination of other types of batteries. Anything out of that range is usually too heavy and unwieldy for practical use. Another typical design is a box containing a large battery (or battery pack) at the handle end and wires embedded in a fibreglass rod, ending with two electrodes in a rubber tip. This design is well-suited for use as a regular cattle prod.

The use of electric cattle prods has been debated by many people. Organizations such as PETA contend that the use of cattle prods is as much mentally harmful as it is physically. Most farmers contend that the short shock is minutely felt, and soon forgotten.

Usage on people in policing and torture 

Cattle prods today are designed with a high range of voltages and currents. If more powerful prods are applied continuously to the skin, the current eventually causes heating, searing, burning, and scarring of skin at the contact point. Electric prods have found favour with torturers.

Prior to the development of stun batons and the taser, electric cattle prods were also used on people in varying degrees. Their first common usage on people occurred during the Civil Rights Movement of the 1960s; prods were first adopted by police officers in Alabama to use on protesters and agencies elsewhere followed; Hotshot later developed an electric police baton.

The picana is an electric prod based originally on the cattle prod but designed specifically for human torture. It works at very high voltage and low current so as to maximize pain and minimize the physical marks left on the victim. Among its advantages over other torture devices is that it is portable, easy to use, and allows the torturer to localize the electric shocks to the most sensitive places on the body, where they cause intense pain that can be repeated many times.

Electric shock devices, including cattle prods, have been used as a means of coercive control on autistic and mentally handicapped people. Famous proponents of this practice include Matthew Israel and Ivar Lovaas. The use of electric shocks in this way has been condemned as torture by the United Nations special rapporteur, and the United States Food and Drug Administration issued a ban on all such electric shock devices in 2020.

On August 14, 2013 in Lakewood Township, New Jersey, gang leader Mendel Epstein told two undercover Federal Bureau of Investigation agents that he used a cattle prod to coerce Jewish husbands to grant religious divorces to their wives, leading the press to nickname him "The Prodfather". The cattle prod had been favored as a torture device by Epstein due to its effectiveness when used on cattle. He was convicted of conspiring to commit kidnapping, and sentenced to 10 years in prison.

Alternatives 

Cattle can be difficult to move and direct for a variety of reasons. Prods can be useful for moving stubborn or aggressive animals, but often cattle will not move forward when they are fearful of something they see, hear, or smell. Removal of these distractions or hiding them, such as with solid wall partitions, can greatly reduce animal handling problems, however, cattle handlers cannot completely overcome the animal's decision not to move forward.

By studying the psychology of the animals and redesigning the working environment it is possible to handle the animals without the need for brute force and causing pain and suffering to the animal in many, but not all, cases. Significant work in this regard has been done by Colorado State University professor Temple Grandin to study how cattle perceive the environment around them and to design better livestock slaughterhouse handling systems that do not induce fear into the animal.

In popular culture 

In the Martin Scorsese film Casino, a cheating gambler is shocked with a cattle prod by a security guard, which is passed off as a heart attack. As an example of "cheater's justice," he is threatened with a circular saw and has his fingers broken with a hammer.

In Fargo, a television crime series based on the film of the same name, a cattle prod is used on numerous occasions as a weapon against humans in season 2.

In the 1991 PBS American Experience episode on Coney Island, in the early 20th century, guests were subjected to a dwarf clown who would shock guests with an electric cattle prod.

In Pretty Little Liars, a popular television series, a cattle prod was used to torture one of the leading characters Hanna Marin.

In Ridley Scott's 1979 horror film Alien, Ellen Ripley and her crew attempt to capture an escaped Xenomorph with the help of a cattle prod.

In Margaret Atwood's 1985 novel The Handmaid's Tale and the 2017 Hulu TV series adaptation, cattle prods are used by the Aunts to control the Handmaids, a class of fertile women who serve as surrogates for the ruling Commanders.

In the early 90s, WWE wrestler The Mountie would use a cattle prod aka shock stick on opponents.  In WCW, wrestler Scott Hall would use a cattle prod on wrestler Bill Goldberg in his match against Kevin Nash in Starrcade 1998.

In Bottom, a British television sitcom, in Season 3 Episode 2 (Terror), a homemade cattle prod device is used to convince people to hand over money during Halloween.

Cattle prods feature as usable weapons in the video games Fallout, Fallout 2 and Fallout: New Vegas, the latter themed around agricultural society in the American Southwest.

In the 2017 film The Shape of Water, a cattle prod features prominently. It is the weapon of choice used by the primary antagonist, Col. Strickland, who carries it with him constantly. Strickland uses the cattle prod to torture both a captive amphibian man and a Soviet spy.

In the world premiere for the 2022 film Jackass Forever, Johnny Knoxville uses a cattle prod to kick Sami Zayn out of the premiere, whilst in the midst of their kayfabe feud on WWE.

In the massive multiplayer online computer game Runescape, a "cattleprod" is used as part of a members-only quest to move sheep to specific locations.

See also 
 Graduated Electronic Decelerator

References 

Cattle
Farming tools
Non-lethal weapons
Instruments of torture